Zhaojiabang Road is an interchange station between lines 7 and 9 of the Shanghai Metro. It is located near the junction of Zhaojiabang Road and Wulumuqi Road in Xuhui District. The station began operation on 5 December 2009 with the start of operations on line 7 and became an interchange station on 31 December 2009 with the start of operations on line 9.

Station layout 

Railway stations in Shanghai
Shanghai Metro stations in Xuhui District
Railway stations in China opened in 2009
Line 7, Shanghai Metro
Line 9, Shanghai Metro
Xuhui District